Pandamen is a 2010 Taiwanese TV series directed by and starring Jay Chou and co-starring Nan Quan Mama members Yuhao Zhan and Devon Song in the title roles of "Pandamen".

Cast

Main cast

Other cast

Guest star

Viewership ratings

External links
 CTS Official Website

Taiwanese drama television series
Taiwanese television series
2010 Taiwanese television series debuts
2010 Taiwanese television series endings
Chinese crime television series
Chinese science fiction television series
Chinese action television series
Superhero television shows
Chinese Television System original programming